André Ribeiro dos Santos (born 25 February 1988), simply known as André Ribeiro, is a Brazilian footballer who plays for Americano FC as a defender.

Honours

Individual
 Indonesian Soccer Awards:Best 11 2019

Career statistics

References

External links

1988 births
Living people
Brazilian footballers
Brazilian expatriate footballers
Association football defenders
Campeonato Brasileiro Série C players
Campeonato Brasileiro Série D players
Sport Club Internacional players
Porto Alegre Futebol Clube players
Grêmio Esportivo Brasil players
Esporte Clube Novo Hamburgo players
CR Vasco da Gama players
Grêmio Barueri Futebol players
Esporte Clube Cruzeiro players
Sociedade Esportiva e Recreativa Caxias do Sul players
Club Sportivo Sergipe players
Itumbiara Esporte Clube players
Luverdense Esporte Clube players
Parauapebas Futebol Clube players
Persipura Jayapura players
Macaé Esporte Futebol Clube players
Americano Futebol Clube players
Brazilian expatriate sportspeople in Indonesia
Expatriate footballers in Indonesia
Footballers from Porto Alegre